Lisa McShea (born 29 October 1974) is an Australian former tennis player. She played professionally from 1996 to 2006. As a junior player, McShea won the 1992 Wimbledon Championships doubles title. She was also more successful in doubles during her professional career, winning four WTA Tour and 56 ITF doubles events.

Biography
McShea was born in Redcliffe, Queensland to Ed and Lois McShea, and is the oldest of four children. She has a sister, Catherine, and brothers Andrew and Danny. Her entire family plays tennis. McShea, who was coached by Paul Campbell, resides in Scarborough, Australia.

McShea played at Grand Slam events in three occasions. She played at the Australian Open in 1994 and 2000, and at Wimbledon in 1999, but was unable to pass the first round. In doubles, her best Grand Slam result was the quarterfinals of the 2001 Wimbledon Championships – along with Rachel McQuillan, she defeated the third seeds Cara Black and Elena Likhovtseva en route to the quarterfinals, where they lost to the ninth seeds Kim Clijsters and Ai Sugiyama. At the same tournament, McShea reached the mixed doubles quarterfinals partnering with Bob Bryan.

She played for Australia Fed Cup team once, during the 2004 World Group Playoffs. Partnering with Christina Wheeler, she defeated the doubles team of Thailand. Her highest career rankings are world No. 139 in singles, achieved on 31 July 2000, and No. 32, achieved on 17 January 2005.

WTA career finals

Doubles: 6 (4 titles, 2 runner-ups)

ITF finals

Singles: 18 (9–9)

Doubles: 84 (56–28)

Fed Cup performance

References

External links
 
 
 
 

Australian female tennis players
Sportswomen from Queensland
Tennis people from Queensland
1974 births
Living people
Wimbledon junior champions
Grand Slam (tennis) champions in girls' doubles
20th-century Australian women
21st-century Australian women